Deepak Dogra (born 15 October 1991) is an Indian cricketer. He made his Twenty20 debut for Jammu and Kashmir in the 2016–17 Inter State Twenty-20 Tournament on 1 February 2017. He made his List A debut for Jammu & Kashmir in the 2017–18 Vijay Hazare Trophy on 12 February 2018.

References

External links
 

1991 births
Living people
Indian cricketers
Jammu and Kashmir cricketers
People from Jammu